Thomas M. Salmon (born July 28, 1963), a politician, was Vermont Auditor of Accounts from 2007 to 2013. He did not run for reelection in 2012, and was succeeded by Democrat/Progressive Douglas R. Hoffer. He was elected in 2006 as a Democrat and then became a Republican in 2009.

Early life 
Salmon was born in Bellows Falls, Vermont. He graduated from Bellows Falls Union High School and attended Worcester Academy as a postgraduate year.  He holds a Bachelor of Science degree in accounting from Boston College.

Salmon worked for Coopers and Lybrand (now PricewaterhouseCoopers) in Hartford and Los Angeles, and became a Certified Public Accountant in 1993.

He taught school in the Los Angeles Unified School District from 1992 to 2002, and is a licensed English teacher for grades 7 to 12 in both California and Vermont.  From 2004 to 2005 he was a Special Education teacher at Bellows Falls Union High School, working with emotionally challenged boys.

Political career 
Salmon served on the Rockingham, Vermont Selectboard beginning in 2006.

In the 2006 Vermont Auditor of Accounts election, Salmon challenged Republican incumbent Randolph D. "Randy" Brock.  With over 250,000 votes cast, the initial vote tally put Brock ahead by just 137 votes.  Salmon requested a recount, and on December 21, 2006, he was declared the winner by a margin of 102 votes.  This was one of the closest election victories in Vermont history, and the first time in the state's history that a statewide election's initially reported result was overturned by a recount.

Salmon was sworn in as state auditor on January 4, 2007.  He was reelected in 2008 as a Democrat.  He became a Republican in 2009 and won reelection in 2010 as the Republican nominee.  In 2011 he became a Certified Fraud Examiner.  He did not run for reelection in 2012.

Military service
Salmon is a noncommissioned officer in the Navy Reserve and was deployed to Iraq in 2008.  He ran successfully for reelection while serving overseas.

Driving while intoxicated arrest
In 2009 Salmon was arrested for driving while intoxicated.  His blood alcohol content was .086, over the legal limit of .080.  He pleaded guilty and paid a fine, and later created public service announcements promoting safe driving.

Later career
After leaving office in January, 2013, Salmon worked briefly as director of a special audit unit for the Massachusetts Department of Transportation. He left to accept a position in Washington, D.C. as the Assistant Inspector General for Audit Services at the Office of Inspector General in the United States Department of Health and Human Services.  At HHS he is responsible for audit services in eight regional offices across the country.

Personal life
He is the son of former Vermont Governor Thomas P. Salmon.

See also
 List of American politicians who switched parties in office

References

External links 
 Vermont Auditor of Accounts website
 Salmon's campaign website

1963 births
Living people
Carroll School of Management alumni
People from Bellows Falls, Vermont
Military personnel from Vermont
State Auditors of Vermont
Vermont Democrats
Vermont Republicans
United States Navy personnel of the War in Afghanistan (2001–2021)